El Pinar (Spanish: El Pinar de El Hierro) is a Spanish municipality on the island of El Hierro (nicknamed Isla del Meridiano, the "Meridian Island"), Canary Islands. It was created in 2007.

Sites of interest
At the western end of El Pinar is the Punta Orchilla lighthouse which was completed in 1933.

See also 
Pico de Malpaso

References 

Municipalities in El Hierro